Sunil Bajpai is the Chair Professor of Vertebrate Paleontology in the Department of Earth Sciences, Indian Institute of Technology Roorkee. He also served as the director of the Birbal Sahni Institute of Palaeosciences from January 2013 to July 2018.

Sunil Bajpai predominantly works on the Cenozoic vertebrates of India with focus on marine mammals, such as whales and sea cows. Bajpai and his collaborators fossil discoveries from the Eocene of Kutch (Gujarat) and the Himalayas have helped in understanding how whales have evolved. Bajpai also works on land mammals, which includes the early representatives of horses, artiodactyls, and primates, such as the stem perissodactyl family Cambaytheriidae, artiodactyl Gujaratia, and primates such as the adapoid Marcgodinotius and the omomyid Vastanomys. Additionally, he has worked on many other fossil vertebrates such as sharks, bony fishes, frogs, snakes, lizards, insectivores, rodents, etc. He has also been involved in studies of latest Cretaceous-Paleocene faunas of the Deccan volcanic province of India and their implications in understanding the northward drift of the Indian tectonic plate.

Education

Bajpai carried out his Ph.D. studies in Paleontology from the Centre of Advanced Study in Geology, Panjab University, Chandigarh, in 1990.

Honors and awards
 Fellow of the National Academy of Sciences, India (2008)
 Fellow of the Indian Academy of Sciences (2007)
 National Geoscience Award, Ministry of Mines, Government of India (2014)
 National award for Geosciences and Technology, Ministry of Earth Sciences, Govt of India (2018)
 Ptilotrypa bajpaii a fossil bryozoan, and  Limnocythere bajpaii a fossil ostracod are named after Bajpai in recognition of his contributions

Collaborators

J. G. M. Thewissen, the Dutch-American Paleontologist from the Northeastern Ohio Medical University, Rootstow,  whose research is mainly focused on whale evolution, and Daryl Domning from Howard University, Washington D.C., specialist of fossil sirenians have been the main collaborators of Bajpai.

Selected publications
 
 Bajpai, Sunil; Kapur, Vivesh V; Das, Debasis P; Tiwari, B N; Saravanan, N; Sharma, Ritu (2005). "Early Eocene land mammals from the Vastan Lignite Mine, District Surat (Gujarat), western India". Journal of the Palaeontological Society of India. http://palaeontologicalsociety.in/publication.php
 Bajpai, Sunil; Kay, Richard F.; Williams, Blythe A.; Das, Debasis P.; Kapur, Vivesh V.; Tiwari, B. N. (2008). "The oldest Asian record of Anthropoidea". Proceedings of the National Academy of Sciences, USA. 105 (32): 11093–11098. doi:10.1073/pnas.0804159105. ISSN 0027-8424.
 Bajpai, S. & Sahni, A., eds. (2009). India’s fossil biota: Current perspectives and Emerging Approaches. Journal of Biosciences, vol. 34, issue 5, special issue (Springer) https://doi.org/10.1007/s12038-009-0082-7

References

External links
 Sunil Bajpai, Institute Chair Professor, IIT Roorkee

Year of birth missing (living people)
Living people
Panjab University alumni
Indian paleontologists
Vertebrate paleontologists
Fellows of the Indian Academy of Sciences